Mannequin is a 1987 American romantic comedy film directed by Michael Gottlieb in his directional debut, and written by Edward Rugoff and Gottlieb. It stars Andrew McCarthy, Kim Cattrall, Estelle Getty, Meshach Taylor and G. W. Bailey. The original music score was composed by Sylvester Levay. A modern retelling of the Pygmalion myth, the film revolves around a chronically underemployed passionate artist named Jonathan Switcher who lands a job as a department-store window dresser and the mannequin he created which becomes inhabited by the spirit of a woman from Ancient Egypt, but only comes alive for Jonathan.

Mannequin received a nomination for an Academy Award for Best Original Song for its main title song, "Nothing's Gonna Stop Us Now" by Starship, which reached number one on both the Billboard Hot 100 and UK Singles Chart. Both early and later critical reception has been generally negative with common criticisms being made towards the ludicrous premise and the overly farcical and sentimental tone; however, audience responses have been comparatively more positive with it being a surprise box office success and in the years since its release, the film has developed a cult following. In 1991, a sequel to the film called Mannequin Two: On the Move was released. Though the sequel takes place in the same department store in Philadelphia, only actors Meshach Taylor and Andrew Hill Newman returned from the original film. The sequel received an overwhelming negative critical reaction and was a box office failure.

Plot

In Ancient Egypt, Ema "Emmy" Hesire takes refuge in a pyramid, pleading to the gods that she find true love rather than enter an arranged marriage. Emmy suddenly vanishes before her mother's eyes. In 1987 Philadelphia, Jonathan Switcher is a sculptor working at a mannequin warehouse and finishes a single female mannequin he considers a masterpiece. His boss fires him for spending time trying to make his mannequins works of art rather than assembling several each day.

Jonathan takes a number of odd jobs and is fired each time for working too slowly because he tries to make each project artistic. His girlfriend Roxie Shield, an employee of the Illustra department store, dumps him, criticizing him as a flake. After his motorcycle breaks down in the rain, Jonathan passes the Prince & Company department store. Seeing his mannequin in the display window, he remarks she is the first work that made him feel like a true artist. The next morning, he saves store owner Claire Timkin from being injured by her own shop sign. Grateful, Claire orders store manager Mr. Richards (who is secretly paid by Illustra to sabotage Prince & Company so it can be bought) to give Jonathan a job. Viewed with suspicion by security guard Captain Felix Maxwell, Jonathan works with and befriends window dresser Hollywood Montrose. When Jonathan is putting together a window display, the mannequin he made comes to life with Emmy's spirit. She says she has existed for centuries as a muse, sometimes inhabiting the works of an artist she admires and inspires. She has encountered amazing people but has never found true love. Emmy explains the gods allow her life when she and Jonathan are unobserved, otherwise she is a mannequin.

With Emmy's help, Jonathan's window display is a massive success. Now placed in charge of visual merchandising, Jonathan asks Emmy to continue helping with the displays. Over several weeks, they create several popular displays, attracting new business while also deepening their relationship. Montrose realizes Jonathan loves a mannequin he created but does not judge him. Illustra's chief executive B.J. Wert sends Roxie to poach Jonathan but he refuses, saying he now works for people who value him. Annoyed by Felix's ineptitude and Richards' attitude towards Jonathan, Claire fires them. Deeply impressed with his work, Claire makes Jonathan vice president of the department store. One night, Jonathan takes Emmy through the city on his motorcycle, despite how unusual this seems to bystanders. He is witnessed by Richards and Felix, who conclude he is deeply fixated on a female mannequin.

Richards and Felix (who now works for Illustra) steal the female mannequins from Prince & Company. The next morning, Jonathan confronts Wert about the theft, who makes another job offer. Furious over Jonathan caring so much about the mannequin he calls Emmy, Roxie storms off. Jonathan follows Roxie while being pursued by security guards including Felix. Wert and Richards demand the police be called. Roxie loads the stolen mannequins into the store's large trash compactor, then is knocked out by debris. As Hollywood holds the pursuers at bay with a fire hose, a janitor watches Jonathan jump onto the compactor's conveyor belt to save the mannequin that is Emmy. As Jonathan risks his life for her, Emmy comes to life. Once safe, she realizes she is truly and permanently alive again. Emmy thanks the gods for uniting her with her true love and Jonathan promises to love her forever.

While the janitor wonders if other mannequins will come to life, Hollywood arrives and realizes Emmy was alive the entire time. Felix and his fellow guards rush in, followed by Wert and Richards who demand the police arrest Jonathan. Claire arrives, revealing she has security video of Richards and Felix breaking and entering, and committing theft. She accuses Wert of conspiracy, and Jonathan adds the man also kidnapped Emmy. Wert fires Roxie as he is arrested and hauled away alongside Richards and Felix. Jonathan realizes the security footage may have shown him being romantic with a mannequin, but Claire coyly suggests he should not worry about that. Some time later, Jonathan and Emmy are married in the store window of Prince & Company, with Claire as maid of honor and Hollywood as best man. Numerous pedestrians outside the store window applaud the wedding.

Cast
 Andrew McCarthy as Jonathan Switcher
 Kim Cattrall as Ema "Emmy" Hesire
 Estelle Getty as Claire Timkin
 James Spader as Mr. Richards
 G. W. Bailey as Captain Felix Maxwell
 Meshach Taylor as Hollywood Montrose
 Carole Davis as Roxie Shield
 Steve Vinovich as B.J. Wert 
 Christopher Maher as Armand
 Phyllis Newman as Emmy's Mother
 Phil Rubenstein as Mannequin Factory Boss
 Andrew Hill Newman as Compactor Room Janitor

Production

Development
The idea for the film came when director Michael Gottlieb was walking down Fifth Avenue and thought he saw a mannequin move in the window of Bergdorf Goodman. Others observe the similarities to the plot of the film One Touch of Venus (1948) and to the myth of Pygmalion, who sculpted a statue that came to life when he fell in love.

The film was made based on the marketing principles of noted Hollywood market researcher Joseph Farrell, who served as an executive producer. The film was specifically designed to appeal to target demographics. Though not a star, McCarthy was cast after tests of his films showed that he strongly appealed to girls, the target audience.

Filming
The producers contacted various state film commissions across America looking for an elegant center city department store in which to shoot the movie. They visited stores across the country before settling on John Wanamaker's in Philadelphia (now Macy's Center City). The store was given the name Prince and Company for the film. Interior filming at Wanamaker's took about three weeks, with shooting usually beginning around 9 pm and going until 6 am the next day.

Additional scenes were filmed in the formal gardens behind The Hotel Hershey. Scenes taking place at the fictitious department store Illustra were filmed at the Boscov's department store in the former Camp Hill Mall (now Camp Hill Shopping Center) near Harrisburg, Pennsylvania. Philadelphia mayor Wilson Goode estimated the film injected $3 million into the city.

Prior to the start of filming, Cattrall spent six weeks posing for a Santa Monica sculptor, who captured her likeness. Six mannequins, each with a different expression, were made. Cattrall recalled, "There's no way to play a mannequin except if you want to sit there as a dummy [...] I did a lot of body-building because I wanted to be as streamlined as possible. I wanted to match the mannequins as closely as I could." The actress also said that doing the film made her feel "grown up":

I've become more of a leading lady instead of, like, the girl... All the other movies that I've done I played the girl, and the plot was around the guy. I've never had anybody to do special lighting for me, or find out what clothes look good on me, or what camera angles are best for me... In this movie, I learned a lot from it. It's almost like learning old Hollywood techniques... I've always been sort of a tomboy. I feel great being a girl, wearing a dress.

Music
Featured in the film, "Nothing's Gonna Stop Us Now" was a song co-written by Albert Hammond and Diane Warren and recorded by the American rock band Starship in 1986. It is a duet featuring Starship vocalists Grace Slick and Mickey Thomas. It reached number one on the Billboard Hot 100 on April 4, 1987, and topped the UK Singles Chart for four weeks the following month, becoming the UK's second-biggest-selling single of 1987.

Reception

Box office
The film debuted at number three at the US box office behind Platoon and Outrageous Fortune, grossing $6 million over the four-day President's Day weekend, surpassing the other opener, Over the Top starring Sylvester Stallone, and exceeding box office projections. The film made a strong profit and grossed at least five times the budget for a total of $42.7 million in the United States and Canada.

Critical response
On Rotten Tomatoes, the film has an approval rating of 20% based on 40 reviews and an average rating of 3.9/10. The site's consensus states: "Mannequin is a real dummy, outfitted with a ludicrous concept and a painfully earnest script that never springs to life, despite the best efforts of an impossibly charming Kim Cattrall." On Metacritic, the film has a score of 21 out of 100 based on reviews from 13 critics, indicating "generally unfavorable reviews". Audiences surveyed by CinemaScore gave the film a grade B+ on scale of A to F.

It was savaged by Leonard Maltin, who called it "absolute rock-bottom fare, dispiriting for anyone who remembers what movie comedy should be." In his print review, Roger Ebert awarded it a half star and wrote, "A lot of bad movies are fairly throbbing with life. Mannequin is dead. The wake lasts 1 1/2 hours, and then we can leave the theater." Ebert also went on to single out the character of Montrose (who is portrayed by a heterosexual actor) as being an offensive and cynically flamboyant gay caricature.

Rita Kempley of The Washington Post called the film "made by, for, and about dummies." Janet Maslin of The New York Times puts the blame on the writer-director: "as co-written and directed by Michael Gottlieb, Mannequin is a state-of-the-art showcase of perfunctory technique." Dan McQuade, writing in Philadelphia Magazine, referencing the film's use of Philadelphia as a setting, after panning the film itself wrote, "The message of Mannequin, clumsy as it is, is that the greatest place and time in recorded history is 1980s Philadelphia... Truly, this is the most uplifting film ever made about the city."

David Cornelius of DVD Talk wrote: "Mannequin is one of the stupidest movies ever conceived, and one of the worst. Which makes it, in its own lousy way, mesmerizing. To watch it is to get sucked in by its hypnotic ways; its very off-the-wall shoddiness is astounding. Spader alone is worth the price of admission – surely aware of the movie's badness, the actor hams it up with a deliriously over-the-top performance." He called it "a Bad Movie Essential" but warned viewers with a lower pain threshold for bad films to "obviously skip it as it is a dreadful film".

Accolades

Sequel and remake
In 1991, a sequel called Mannequin Two: On the Move was released and was directed by Stewart Raffill. The sequel was dubbed as "one of the worst follow-ups ever made." The second film featured different main characters but with the same department store setting and with Meshach Taylor reprising his role. Andrew Hill Newman, who played the Compactor Room Janitor in the first time, returns in the sequel as a security guard named Andy Ackerman. It is not explicitly said whether this is a new character entirely or is the original character (who was not named), now working in a different capacity for the same store.

In 2010, Gladden Entertainment executives were said to be in the "early development" stage of the remake, envisioning a plot of the man crushing on a "laser display hologram" as opposed to a mannequin. However, no further details were made public about its development.

Home media
Mannequin was released on VHS, Betamax, and digital stereo LaserDisc format in September 1987 by Cannon Films through Media Home Entertainment. The film was released on DVD by MGM Home Entertainment on October 7, 2004, in a widescreen Region 1 DVD, and was later re-released to DVD on January 16, 2008, in a new double feature edition with Mannequin Two: On the Move as the second disc. Mannequin was released on Blu-ray for the first time by Olive Films (under license from MGM) on November 3, 2015.

Legacy
Despite being savaged upon release by critics, Mannequin has been cited as a romantic-comedy cult classic and has managed to garner an ardent and strong cult following who have praised the film's sets, costumes, supporting cast and script as well as the romantic chemistry between lead actors McCarthy and Cattrall. The film is also considered one of the many popular comedy films from the golden age of 1980s Brat Pack films since it features actors Spader, Cattrall and McCarthy who all starred in other movies of that era. 

Songs from the movie's soundtrack, including "Nothing's Gonna Stop Us Now" by the American rock band Starship and "In My Wildest Dreams" by the Go-Go's lead vocalist Belinda Carlisle, have achieved commercial success and the former in particular has attained continued notoriety throughout the years, and has often been cited as a defining and iconic sentimental power ballad. Retrospective reviews have also even commended the provocative and progressive portrayal of Hollywood for being an unashamedly positive homosexual character who befriends the main character and manages to be heroic in the finale.

Kenickie/Rosita bass player Emmy Kate Montrose (born Emma Jackson, 1978) took her stage name from the characters Emmy and Montrose in the film. The film was also parodied by James Corden and Victoria Beckham in 2017 on The Late Late Show with James Corden as a precursor to the Carpool Karaoke segment.

References

External links

 
 
 
 

1987 films
1987 directorial debut films
1987 independent films
1987 romantic comedy films
1980s American films
1980s English-language films
1980s fantasy comedy films
1980s romantic fantasy films
American fantasy comedy films
American independent films
American LGBT-related films
American romantic comedy films
American romantic fantasy films
Films about businesspeople
Films about curses
Films about reincarnation
Films based on classical mythology
Films directed by Michael Gottlieb
Films scored by Sylvester Levay
Films set in ancient Egypt
Films set in department stores
Films set in Philadelphia
Films shot in Harrisburg, Pennsylvania
Films shot in Philadelphia
20th Century Fox films
Mannequins in films